"Special Morning Day to You" is a song by Japanese singer songwriter Mai Kuraki, taken from her fourth compilation album Mai Kuraki Best 151A: Love & Hope (2014). It was released on 15 August 2012 through Giza Studio as a double-A sid single with "Koi ni Koishite". The song was written by Kuraki herself and her long-time collaborator Akihito Tokunaga, and produced by Kuraki herself and Kannonji. "Special Morning Day to You" served as the television commercial song to the Canadian mineral water brand, Icefield. 

The single reached number seven in Japan, selling 21,970 copies in total.

Music video
A short version of the official music video was first released on Kuraki's official YouTube account on August 3, 2012. As of February 2018, it has received over 97,800 views on YouTube.

Track listing

Charts

Weekly charts

Monthly charts

Year-end charts

Certification and sales

|-
! scope="row"| Japan (RIAJ)
| 
| 21,970 
|-
|}

Release history

References

2012 singles
2012 songs
Mai Kuraki songs
Songs written by Mai Kuraki
Songs with music by Akihito Tokunaga
Song recordings produced by Daiko Nagato